Bajo Nunatak is a conspicuous rocky peak rising to 210 m at the south edge of the ice cap of Robert Island in the South Shetland Islands, Antarctica.  The nunatak surmounts Zahari Point to the southeast, Micalvi Cove to the east-southeast, and English Strait to the southwest.

The feature was charted and descriptively named by the Chilean Antarctic Expeditions in 1948–50.

Location

See also
 Robert Island
 South Shetland Islands

Maps
 L.L. Ivanov et al. Antarctica: Livingston Island and Greenwich Island, South Shetland Islands. Scale 1:100000 topographic map. Sofia: Antarctic Place-names Commission of Bulgaria, 2005.
 L.L. Ivanov. Antarctica: Livingston Island and Greenwich, Robert, Snow and Smith Islands. Scale 1:120000 topographic map.  Troyan: Manfred Wörner Foundation, 2009.

References
 SCAR Composite Antarctic Gazetteer.

Landforms of Robert Island
Nunataks of the South Shetland Islands